Dyspessa turbinans is a species of moth of the family Cossidae. It is found in Libya.

References

Moths described in 1926
Dyspessa
Moths of Africa